Imre is a Hungarian masculine given name.

Imre may also refer to:

Imre (surname)
Imre: A Memorandum, 1906 novel by Edward Irenaeus Prime-Stevenson